Igor Šošo (born 27 August 1976) is a former Serbian footballer and futsal player who played for the Milwaukee Rampage in the A-League.

Career statistics

Club

Notes

References

1976 births
Living people
Serbian footballers
Serbian men's futsal players
Serbian expatriate footballers
Milwaukee Rampage players
A-League (1995–2004) players
Serbian expatriate sportspeople in the United States
Expatriate soccer players in the United States
Association footballers not categorized by position